Synuchus keinigus is a species of ground beetle in the subfamily Harpalinae. It was described by Morvan in 1994.

References

Synuchus
Beetles described in 1994